Andrew Stuart Mackenzie-Low (1878 – 1962) was a British philatelist who signed the Roll of Distinguished Philatelists in 1952.

Publications
Notes on Postage Stamps of Egypt 1866-72.

References

British philatelists
Signatories to the Roll of Distinguished Philatelists
Fellows of the Royal Philatelic Society London
1878 births
1962 deaths